In enzymology, a thiol oxidase is an enzyme that catalyzes the chemical reaction

4 R'C(R)SH + O2  2 R'C(R)S-S(R)CR' + 2 H2O

Thus, the two substrates of this enzyme are R'C(R)SH and O2, whereas its two products are R'C(R)S-S(R)CR' and H2O.

This enzyme belongs to the family of oxidoreductases, specifically those acting on a sulfur group of donors with oxygen as acceptor.  The systematic name of this enzyme class is thiol:oxygen oxidoreductase. This enzyme is also called sulfhydryl oxidase.

References

 
 

EC 1.8.3
Enzymes of unknown structure